Peter Joseph Ferrara (born April 26, 1955) is an American lawyer, policy analyst, and columnist who is an analyst for The Heartland Institute. He is former general counsel for the American Civil Rights Union. A libertarian scholar, he is known for supporting privatization of the Social Security program and climate change denialism.

Early life and education
A 2005 profile for the Harvard Law Bulletin reported that Ferrara recalled  at age nine "being transfixed while watching television as Barry Goldwater stormed the 1964 Republican National Convention." Ferrara grew up in Phoenix, Arizona and graduated in 1976 from Harvard College with an A.B. in economics magna cum laude and from Harvard Law School in 1979 cum laude. At Harvard, Ferrara wrote at the student newspaper The Harvard Crimson. While in law school, he also participated in the Harvard Libertarian Association. Future Supreme Court Chief Justice John Roberts attended both Harvard College and Law School with Ferrara.

Career
His senior law school thesis evolved into the debut hardcover publication by the libertarian Cato Institute in 1980, Social Security: The Inherent Contradiction. From 1981 to 1983, Ferrara served in the White House Office of Policy Development under President Ronald Reagan and was an associate deputy attorney general from 1991 to 1993. Between those positions, Ferrara became a Heritage Foundation analyst specializing in Social Security issues. He also became an insurance consultant and provided expertise in Social Security to media. In 1987, Ferrara joined the faculty of the George Mason University School of Law and directed its legal writing programs until 1991. As late as 2003, Ferrara has taught there.

In the early 2000s (decade), he founded the Virginia chapter of Club for Growth and directed the International Center for Law and Economics.

As a writer, Ferrara's employers included erstwhile lobbyist and convicted felon, Jack Abramoff, who hired Ferrara to write op-ed pieces favorable to Abramoff clients. Ferrara doesn't disclose which pieces he is paid to write, but according to a Business Week article, the specific pieces may have been articles in The Washington Times about the Northern Marianas Islands and The Choctaw Indian tribe. Ferrara stated that those writings reflect his independently held views on the respective subjects. "I do that all the time. I've done that in the past, and I'll do it in the future."

Ferrara was tied to Abramoff again in 2020 in connection with AML Bitcoin after the FBI charged Abramoff with conspiracy to commit wire fraud and violating the Lobbying Disclosure Act. Ferrara wrote op-eds in favor of AML Bitcoin that were placed in The American Spectator, Investor’s Business Daily, and The Washington Times.

Ferrara was a senior policy adviser at the Institute for Policy Innovation. In April 2011, Ferrara became senior fellow for entitlement and budget policy at The Heartland Institute. He served concurrently as general counsel for the American Civil Rights Union and policy director of the Carleson Center for Welfare Reform. He was a member of the District of Columbia Bar but is now on inactive status.

Ferrara's articles have been published in such outlets as National Review, The Washington Times, The American Spectator, and FoxNews.com. He is a regular guest on the Thom Hartmann radio program.

Viewpoints
In 1987, The New York Times published an op-ed by Ferrara in which he advocated capping the Social Security payroll tax. The newspaper also interviewed Ferrara that year about a proposal by Secretary of Health and Human Services Otis R. Bowen to expand Medicare; Ferrara criticized the program for "a lot of gaps in medical coverage for the elderly" and found "no basis for just expanding Medicare to take over coverage that private sector provides now." The George W. Bush administration championed Ferrara's plan to privatize Social Security.

National Review magazine published his essay "What Is An American?" in its September 25, 2001 issue, after the September 11 attacks. In the essay, he claims that "there are more Muslims in America than in Afghanistan", although census numbers show Afghanistan has roughly ten to fifteen times as many Muslims as the United States. The essay was reproduced in a chain e-mail claiming that an Australian dentist wrote it. Ferrara, reflecting on that essay in 2007, still stood by it and supported "more selective immigration so that the U.S. gets a 'better-educated class of Mexican immigrants.'"

Ferrara has also written about climate change, asserting that human activity is not the cause of climate change, that "manmade global warming" is political science rather than natural science, and that actual scientific evidence proves the earth is in a cooling cycle.

Bibliography
 America's Ticking Bankruptcy Bomb (2011)
 Stop the Raid: Social Security the Biggest Rip Off in History (with Denison Smith) (2008)
 Common Cents, Common Dreams: A layman's guide to social security privatization, (1999)
 The Choctaw Revolution: Lessons for Federal Indian Policy, (1998)
 Religion and the Constitution: A reinterpretation (1983)
 Social Security: The Inherent Contradiction (1980)

References

External links
 
 

1955 births
Living people
American columnists
American libertarians
Libertarian theorists
George H. W. Bush administration personnel
George Mason University School of Law faculty
Harvard Law School alumni
The Heritage Foundation
Writers from Phoenix, Arizona
People associated with the Jack Abramoff scandals
Reagan administration personnel
The American Spectator people
United States Deputy Attorneys General
Virginia lawyers
People from Fairfax County, Virginia
Harvard College alumni
Cato Institute people